The Moose Jaw Standard was a Canadian automobile manufactured in Moose Jaw, Saskatchewan in 1917.

Five local residents imported the parts to build twenty-five luxury cars from the United States; these were to be powered by Continental engines.  Once each investor had a car, they gave up the concern after realizing that no one else was willing to buy. The remaining parts were sold, the engineer was paid off, and the project was wound up.

References
David Burgess Wise, The New Illustrated Encyclopedia of Automobiles.

Defunct motor vehicle manufacturers of Canada
1917 establishments in Saskatchewan
Moose Jaw
Vehicle manufacturing companies established in 1917
Vehicle manufacturing companies disestablished in 1917
1917 disestablishments in Saskatchewan
Brass Era vehicles
1910s cars